Rheopteris is a genus of ferns in the subfamily Vittarioideae of the family Pteridaceae with a single species, Rheopteris cheesmaniae, in the Pteridophyte Phylogeny Group classification of 2016 (PPG I). Other sources sink the genus into Monogramma, a genus not recognized in PPG I. The species is native to New Guinea.

References

Pteridaceae
Monotypic fern genera